Javaid Rahi  is an Indian author, a tribal social reformer, and a researcher. He worked in the preservation of the Culture and Heritage of indigenous communities of North-western India focusing on tribal Gujjar-Bakerwal culture. He is a writer of Gojri, Punjabi and Urdu languages.

As a researcher, he has authored 12 books and edited more than 300 books/ magazines in Gujari/ Gojri Urdu and English highlighting the history, culture, and literature related to communities such as Gujjars, Bakarwals, Gaddis, and Sippis, who are listed in the Constitution of India as Scheduled Tribes. In addition to this, he has written research papers and contributed to literary and cultural treaties of tribal communities of India.

Early life 
He was born in a remote village Chandak  in district Poonch, Jammu and Kashmir to  Babu Noor Mohammad Noor a noted Gujari and Punjabi poet.In 2004, he did Doctor of Philosophy degree (Ph.D.) from University of Jammu and done an extensive research  on the six 'Tribal Languages' of Jammu and Kashmiri including Gujari , Shina, Gaddi, Balti, Purgi and Ladakhi also known as  Boti.

Tribal Social reformer and media influencer 

For his work in the field of tribal research and social reforms among the tribes of J&K, Rahi has been Awarded by the Lieutenant Governor of Jammu and Kashmir Manoj Sinha on the eve of 'National Tribal Pride day' on 15th Nov 2021, in a program organized by Tribal Affairs Department, J&K Govt, at Jammu -the winter capital of UT.

On the eve of Republic Day 2022, the government of Jammu and Kashmir has awarded Javaid Rahi with UT level 'Tribal Award 2022'  for his contribution to Tribal Literature, especially to the Gojri language and Gujjar Culture.

In Jammu and Kashmir, the Tribal status was granted to Gujjars, Bakarwals, Gaddis, Sippis, and other communities, in 1991,  but they were without full rights -available to Tribes residing in the rest of India. In 2000,  Rahi started work for the renaissance of tribal identity, art, literature and besides he made aware tribes about their rights as STs.

During his campaigns spread over 21 years, he, while presiding over tribal conferences, seminars pleaded for the adaptation of a national model to develop the Tribal communities of Jammu and Kashmir educationally, socially, economically and culturally.

In 2019, the Government of India extended all the countrywide laws which empower Scheduled Tribes of Union Territory of Jammu and Kashmir through an Act passed by the Parliament of India titled "Jammu and Kashmir Re-organisation Act, 2019" on 5 August 2019 which were widely hailed by the tribal groups.

From 2019 onwards, Rahi has started a UT-wide campaign, organized public gatherings to make aware the Scheduled Tribe communities of Constitutional safeguards, and apprised them about Tribal laws extended to J&K to empower tribes culturally, ethnically, educationally, socially, and politically. Under this campaign, he traveled across Jammu and Kashmir to guide the nomadic population about newly extended laws include about SC/ST Atrocities Act-1989, Forest Rights Act -2006, Delimitation to reserve Constituencies for Tribes-2019, Conservation Act 1980, Amendments in Panchayati Raj Act  -which were made applicable to Jammu and Kashmir to pull out the Tribes from marginalization and social exclusions. He also started audio-visual awareness programs for tribes of J&K, during COVID-19, on Social Media platforms including YouTube Channels, Facebook Pages, Radio, and TV programs.

Career 
He also compiled a research project published in book form titled  'Encyclopedia of Himalayan Gujjars', Folk-Songs of Gujjars Bakarwals, Gujjar Shanakhat ka Safar for Gurjardesh Charitable Trust, Jammu, Tribal Research and Cultural Foundation among others.He also compiled Encyclopedia of Himalayan Gujjars, Folk-Songs of Gujjars Bakarwals, Gujjar Shanakhat ka Safar for Gurjardesh Charitable Trust, Jammu, Tribal Research and Cultural Foundation among others.
He remained head of Curriculum Committees of the University of Jammu, Baba Ghulam Shah Badshah University Rajouri, Jammu and Kashmir Board of School Education and compiled a series of Textbooks in Gojri for Board and Syllabus in Gojri for master's degree Courses.

From 1994 to 2021, Rahi has served in a number of cultural bodies in the Jammu and Kashmir, including All India Radio Jammu/ Srinagar as news editor/ reader (until 2000), Jammu and Kashmir Academy of Art, Culture and Languages as  chief editor-Gojri  from 2000 onwards and edited a number of books and compiled the first-ever Gujari dictionary, containing around 70,000 words.

Main works

Books 
Rahi has authored a number of reference books in Gujari, Urdu, English, and other languages, published by the Jammu and Kashmir Academy of Art, Culture and Languages, Gurjar Desh Charitable Trust, Tribal Research and Cultural Foundation.

Dictionaries
  Compiled first-ever Gojri Dictionary (Concise) –901 pages -Published by J&K Academy of Art, Culture and Languages,  in 2015
  Compiled first-ever Lok-Warsti Dictionary (Folk-Lore Dictionary) –(Volume 2) a Project by Ministry of Culture Govt of India, New Delhi, published in 2002 -2003
  Compiled first-ever Hindi- Gojri Dictionary Published by Tribal Research and Cultural Foundation J&K in 2002.
  Compiled and edited Lughat-e-Gojri (Dictionary of Classical Gojri) Published by J&K Academy of Art, Culture and Languages in 2014

Encyclopedia
 Research: Written "Himailyai Gujjar Encyclopedia" (Encyclopedia of Himalayan Gujjars) a Project of Ministry of Culture, Govt. of India allotted under Cultural Heritage of Himalaya Scheme, published in 2004.

Research books 
  Lok-Virso – (Research )Awarded by Jammu and Kashmir Academy of Art, Culture and Languages(1999)
  Jammu Kashmir ke Qabaila-aur-unki Zubanein (Research /Urdu) –(2010)
  Gujjar Tribe of Jammu and Kashmir (Research English) (2015)
  Gujjar Shanakhat Ka Safar (History and Culture Urdu-2005)
  Gojri Lok Geet -2018
 Gujjar Aur Gojri (2004)
 Gujjar Tarekh (2009)
 Tagore ki Chunam Shairi (2011) Published by Jammu and Kashmir Academy of Art, Culture and Languages
 Gojri Grammer (2012) Published by Jammu and Kashmir Academy of Art, Culture and Languages
 Qadeem Gojri Lughat (2013) Published by Jammu and Kashmir Academy of Art, Culture and Languages
 The Gujjar Tribe of J&K (2012) Published by Jammu and Kashmir Academy of Art, Culture and Languages
 The Gujjars vol 1 to 6 (2013–16) Published by Jammu and Kashmir Academy of Art, Culture and Languages
 The Gujjars Tribe of Jammu and Kashmir Research Book

Recognition 
 J&K Tribal Awards 2022 : Department of Tribal Affairs  Government of Jammu and Kashmir for contribution to Tribal literature (Gojri Language).
Jagom Memorial National Award’ for his distinguished services in the field of preservation and documentation of intangible tribal folk cultural heritage of Gujjars -Bakarwals of Jammu and Kashmir
 BGSB University felicitates Dr. Javaid Rahi
 Best Book Award (2000) Jammu & Kashmir Academy of Art, Culture, and Languages"
 Best Play-script Award (1998) in the Gujari language. Jammu & Kashmir Academy of Art, Culture, and Languages."
 National Fellowship (2000) Union Ministry of Tourism and Culture in New Delhi.

External links 
 
 
Jammu and Kashmir Academy of Art, Culture and Languages

References 

Living people
Gurjar
People from Jammu and Kashmir
People from Poonch district, India
1970 births
Kashmiri poets
Poets from Jammu and Kashmir
University of Jammu alumni
Indian Muslims
Writers from Jammu and Kashmir
Scholars from Jammu and Kashmir
University of Jammu